Church of St. Kilian (Catholic) is a historic church in Wilmont Township, Minnesota, USA. The parish was founded in 1878, when the pastor of Church of St. Adrian recognized the increasing number of settlers in the area. The church building was built in 1900.

The building was added to the National Register of Historic Places in 1998. The parish was part of a four-parish cluster with St. Adrian, St. Anthony in Lismore and Our Lady of Good Counsel in Wilmont. In 2017, it became an oratory.

References

Churches in the Roman Catholic Diocese of Winona-Rochester
Churches on the National Register of Historic Places in Minnesota
Victorian architecture in Minnesota
Gothic Revival church buildings in Minnesota
Roman Catholic churches completed in 1900
Buildings and structures in Nobles County, Minnesota
National Register of Historic Places in Nobles County, Minnesota
20th-century Roman Catholic church buildings in the United States